PS Claud Hamilton was a passenger vessel built for the Great Eastern Railway in 1875.

History

The ship was built by John Elder and Company of Govan for the Great Eastern Railway and launched on 3 June 1875. She was named after the chairman of the Great Eastern Railway, Lord Claude Hamilton. She was despatched from the shipyard on 13 August 1875 and arrived in Harwich on 15 August, after a voyage around the north coast of Scotland via Pentland Firth. Her first captain was William Rivers.

In 1897 she was sold to the Corporation of London and used for transporting cattle. She was sent for scrapping in 1914.

References

1875 ships
Steamships of the United Kingdom
Paddle steamers of the United Kingdom
Ships built on the River Clyde
Ships of the Great Eastern Railway